The 2014 Blancpain Endurance Series season was the fourth season of the Blancpain Endurance Series. The season started on 12 April at Monza and ended on 21 September at the Nürburgring. The season featured five rounds, with each race lasting for a duration of three hours besides the 24 Hours of Spa-Francorchamps and the 1000 km Nürburgring events.

The main trophy of the series, the Pro Cup for drivers, was won by Laurens Vanthoor of the Belgian Audi Club Team WRT squad; Vanthoor won each of the last two races to be held during the season, winning at Spa with René Rast and Markus Winkelhock at the Nürburgring with César Ramos and Christopher Mies. Vanthoor finished 36 points clear of his nearest rivals, Steven Kane, Andy Meyrick and Guy Smith, driving a Bentley for M-Sport. The trio also won two races during the season, at Le Castellet and Silverstone. The season opening round was won by ART Grand Prix, with drivers Grégoire Demoustier, Álvaro Parente and Alexandre Prémat. Belgian Audi Club Team WRT were the winners of the teams' championship, finishing 32 points clear of M-Sport and HTP Motorsport.

Despite not winning a race over the course of the season, Scuderia Villorba Corse drivers Stefano Gai and Andrea Rizzoli were the winners of the Pro-Am Cup. Francesco Castellacci finished in third position; having been a part of the Villorba Corse line-up with Gai and Rizzoli earlier in the season, Castellacci contested the final round with AF Corse. The highest-placed race winners were Henry Hassid and Nick Catsburg, who finished fourth in the championship, as the only crew to win more than one event in the Pro-Am Cup. Scuderia Villorba Corse won the teams' championship, three points ahead of TDS Racing. AF Corse's Peter Mann and Francisco Guedes won the Gentlemen Drivers' Trophy, finishing eight points clear of GT Corse by Rinaldi pairing Alexander Mattschull and Frank Schmickler, who won three races to the single victory of Mann and Guedes. AF Corse also denied GT Corse by Rinaldi the teams' title, by just a single point.

Calendar
In November 2013, the Stéphane Ratel Organisation announced the 2014 calendar. The calendar was the same as the previous season. The race at Circuit Paul Ricard was held on Saturday evening, finishing in night-time conditions.

Entry list

Results and standings

Race results

Championship Standings
Scoring system
Championship points were awarded for the first ten positions in each Championship Race. Entries were required to complete 75% of the winning car's race distance in order to be classified and earn points. Individual drivers were required to participate for a minimum of 25 minutes in order to earn championship points in any race. There were no points awarded for the Pole Position.

Championship Race points

1000 km Paul Ricard points

24 Hours of Spa points
Points were awarded after six hours, after twelve hours and at the finish.

Drivers' Championships

Pro Cup

Teams' Championship

Pro Cup

See also
2014 Blancpain GT Series
2014 Blancpain Sprint Series

References

External links

2014 in motorsport
2014 in European sport